The Marans, is a French breed of dual-purpose chicken, reared both for meat and for its dark brown eggs. It originated in or near the port town of Marans, in the département of Charente-Maritime, in the Nouvelle-Aquitaine region of south-western France.

The eggs are of a rich brown, varying from mahogany to chocolate; only one other chicken breed, the Penedesenca of Catalonia, has such a dark egg.

History 

The Marans originated in – and is named for – the town of Marans, in the département of Charente-Maritime, in the Nouvelle-Aquitaine region of south-western France.

It was created with the local feral chickens descended from fighting game chickens carried from Indonesia and India. Those original Marandaise fowl were "improved" for the table through recombination with imported Croad Langshans.

It was first shown in La Rochelle in 1914 under the name  or 'local chicken'. A breed society was formed in 1929, and in 1931 the first breed standard was drawn up.

Several clutches of fertile eggs were imported to the United Kingdom in or soon after 1929 by Charles Kelvynge Greenway, the second Baron Greenway, and some were hatched. However, it is not certain that the Marans – with unfeathered shanks – shown by Lord Greenway at the Crystal Palace in 1934 descended even partly from this French stock. According to the Poultry Club of Great Britain, the British Marans derives from cross-breeding of a variety of breeds including the Braekel, the Coucou de Malines, the Coucou de Rennes, the Croad Langshan, the Gâtinaise, the Faverolles and the barred Plymouth Rock. It may be a distinct breed, unconnected to the French Marans.

Characteristics 

Ten colours are recognised in the French breed standard for large fowl: white, wheaten, silver cuckoo, golden cuckoo, black, copper-black, silver-black, copper-blue, black-tailed buff and Columbian. Bantam colours are black, white, copper-black and silver cuckoo. Fourteen colours are listed by the Entente Européenne. The British type, with unfeathered legs, is not recognised in France.

In the United Kingdom five colours are recognised: black, dark cuckoo, golden cuckoo and silver cuckoo, with unfeathered shanks; and copper-black, with feathered shanks.

They should have orange eyes. The shanks are usually slate or pink, the soles of the feet should always be white as Marans have white skin, not yellow. Though the original Marans could also be feather-legged birds, British breeders preferred the clean-legged version, and thus feather-legged Marans are now mainly found in France and the United States. The Australian Poultry Standard recognises both feather- and clean-legged. The American Poultry Association only recognises feather-legged.

Use 

Marans hens lay around 150–200 dark brown eggs each year depending on the variety. Marans are historically a dual-purpose bird, prized not only for their dark eggs but for their table qualities as well.

References 

Chicken breeds
Chicken breeds originating in France